Poshteh Sara (also Romanized as Poshteh Sarā; also known as Poshteh Sarān) is a village in Lat Leyl Rural District, Otaqvar District, Langarud County, Gilan Province, Iran. At the 2006 census, its population was 37, in 7 families.

References 

Populated places in Langarud County